The European qualification for the 2023 World Women's Handball Championship, in Denmark, Norway and Sweden, will be played over two rounds.

In the first round of qualification, 18 teams who were not participating at the 2022 European Championship played a knockout round with the winners advancing to the second phase, where the teams will be joined by the remaining ten teams from the European Championship and play play-off games to determine the qualified teams.

Qualification phase 1

Seeding
The draw was held on 29 June 2022 in Vienna, Austria. The winner of each tie advanced to the play-off round.

Overview

|}

Matches

Portugal won 68–31 on aggregate

Kosovo won 55–53 on aggregate.

Slovakia won 89–38 on aggregate.

Israel won 67–50 on aggregate.

Greece won 44–43 on aggregate.

Ukraine won 66–24 on aggregate.

Italy won 59–48 on aggregate.

Austria won 72–50 on aggregate.

Turkey won 83–30 on aggregate.

Qualification phase 2
The draw took place on 19 November 2022. Serbia and Kosovo were not allowed to be drawn against each other. The nine winners of phase 1, the Czech Republic and ten teams from the 2022 European Women's Handball Championship will play in this round. The games will be played on 7 and 8 April and 11 and 12 April 2023.

Seeding

Overview

|}

Matches

Notes

References

External links
Official website

2022 in women's handball

Qualification for handball competitions